Geo. Hattersley was a textile machinery manufacturer from Keighley, West Yorkshire in England, founded in 1789 and responsible for the Hattersley Standard Loom and other types of looms.

History
Richard Hattersley, the founder of the company, served his apprenticeship at Kirkstall Forge. He set up his own business in 1789 at Stubbings Mill, Airworth, manufacturing nuts, bolts, screws and small parts for textile machines. Although the first loom was produced in 1834, it was never delivered as it was smashed up in transit by a group of handloom weavers of the Luddite persuasion fearful for their livelihood.
The replacement was delivered. Hattersley's prospered and developed an extensive catalogue. They adding new products to their range, which included tobacco machines and garden furniture. They also ventured into production and the subsidiary companies have survived where the parent did not. It closed in 1983.

Products
Hattersley produced a large range of types of looms over 120 years for all sectors of the market, from the narrow band looms to sheeting looms. At one time, they had about 26 basic models in their catalogue.

Hattersley Dobby Loom
In 1867 George Hattersley and Sons created a loom with a dobby head.

Hattersley Narrow Fabric Loom
In 1908 Hattersley created smallware loom, these were suitable for weaving wicks for oil lamps, and the webbing that is used in the automotive industry. To demonstrate this loom, the firm bought the Cabbage Mills and later the Greegate Shed in Keighley where they started production of these products. The firm survives today as  Hattersley Aladdin Ltd.

Hattersley Standard Loom
After the recapitalisation boom of 1919 cotton yarn production peaked in 1926, a further investment was sparse. Rayon, artificial silk, was invented in the 1930s in Silsden nearby, and the Hattersley Silk Loom was adapted to weave this new fabric.

Hattersley Domestic Loom
The Hattersley Domestic Loom was part of the Hattersley Domestic System that include other machines such as pirn winder and warping mill. It was a compact machine, combining all the know how and precision engineering of the nineteenth century with the need for a treadle operated loom.

See also
 Hattersley loom

References

External links 
A history written by a descendant
Hattersley Narrow Fabric History
Hattersley Domestic Loom Club

Companies based in the City of Bradford
British companies established in 1789
Textile machinery manufacturers
Weaving
Keighley
Defunct companies based in Yorkshire
1789 establishments in England